Amina Belkadi (born 10 November 1992) is an Algerian judoka. She is a silver medalist at the African Games and a three-time gold medalist at the African Judo Championships. She also won bronze at the Islamic Solidarity Games in 2017 and at the Mediterranean Games in 2022.

Career 

She won the gold medal in the women's 63 kg event at the 2019 African Judo Championships held in Cape Town, South Africa. In the same year, she also competed in the women's 63 kg event at the 2019 World Judo Championships held in Tokyo, Japan.

In 2020, she also won the gold medal in her event at the African Judo Championships held in Antananarivo, Madagascar.

In January 2021, she competed in the women's 63 kg event at the Judo World Masters held in Doha, Qatar. At the 2021 African Judo Championships held in Dakar, Senegal, she won one of the bronze medals in her event. In June 2021, she was eliminated in her first match in the women's 63 kg event at the 2021 World Judo Championships held in Budapest, Hungary.

She won one of the bronze medals in the women's 63 kg event at the 2022 Mediterranean Games held in Oran, Algeria.

Achievements

References

External links 

 

Living people
1992 births
Place of birth missing (living people)
Algerian female judoka
Universiade medalists in judo
Universiade silver medalists for Algeria
Medalists at the 2017 Summer Universiade
Competitors at the 2018 Mediterranean Games
Competitors at the 2022 Mediterranean Games
Mediterranean Games bronze medalists for Algeria
Mediterranean Games medalists in judo
African Games medalists in judo
African Games silver medalists for Algeria
Competitors at the 2019 African Games
Islamic Solidarity Games medalists in judo
Islamic Solidarity Games competitors for Algeria
21st-century Algerian women